Blaine Township, Kansas may refer to:

 Blaine Township, Clay County, Kansas
 Blaine Township, Marion County, Kansas
 Blaine Township, Ottawa County, Kansas, a township in Kansas
 Blaine Township, Smith County, Kansas, a township in Kansas

See also 
 Blaine Township (disambiguation)

Kansas township disambiguation pages